Zhao Shi born 16 March 1993) is a Chinese professional footballer who plays as a goalkeeper for Chinese League One club Sichuan Jiuniu.

Club career

Zhao was first called up to Guoan's first team on 17 February 2015 for an AFC Champions League home game, which was won 2–0 against Bangkok Glass, however he experienced no game time and finished the game as an unused substitute. Throughout the season he did not to make any appearances for Beijing and this continued the following season. On 3 January 2017, Zhao moved to League One side Qingdao Huanghai.

Career statistics 
Statistics accurate as of match played 10 November 2020.

Honours

Club
Qingdao Huanghai
China League One: 2019

References

External links
 

1993 births
Living people
Chinese footballers
Association football goalkeepers
Beijing Guoan F.C. players
Qingdao F.C. players
Sichuan Jiuniu F.C. players
Chinese Super League players
China League One players
China League Two players